Heikki Johannes Ikola (born 9 September 1947) is a Finnish former biathlete. Together with his countryman Juhani Suutarinen he became dominant in the 1970s and the early 1980s. In 1975 he became double world champion in both the 20 km and the relay. He also won the sprint title in 1977 and 1981.

Nowadays Ikola works as a commentator for Finnish channel Yle.

Biathlon results
All results are sourced from the International Biathlon Union.

Olympic Games
3 medals (3 silver)

*Sprint was added as an event in 1980.

World Championships
7 medals (4 gold, 3 silver)

*During Olympic seasons competitions are only held for those events not included in the Olympic program.
**Sprint was added as an event in 1974.

Individual victories
1 victory (1 In)

*Results are from UIPMB and IBU races which include the Biathlon World Cup, Biathlon World Championships and the Winter Olympic Games.

References

External links
 

1947 births
Living people
People from Kurikka
Finnish male biathletes
Biathletes at the 1972 Winter Olympics
Biathletes at the 1976 Winter Olympics
Biathletes at the 1980 Winter Olympics
Olympic biathletes of Finland
Medalists at the 1972 Winter Olympics
Medalists at the 1976 Winter Olympics
Olympic medalists in biathlon
Olympic silver medalists for Finland
Biathlon World Championships medalists
Sportspeople from South Ostrobothnia